Jeugdjournaal ("youth news programme") is a Dutch television news programme produced by the Dutch public service broadcaster NOS for children. The programme has been on air since 1981.

The main evening programme airs at 7:00 pm (CET), running for 20 minutes every night on NPO 3 (formerly Nederland 3). A 5-minute short version also airs on weekdays at 8:45 am. Both programmes are also broadcast on the international satellite Dutch-language television station BVN.

The aim of Jeugdjournaal was to present news that is both of interest to and within the mindset of a younger audience, without shying away from the main national and international news headlines. Because of its use of easy language and simple explanation of current affairs, the broadcasts also attracted a following with adult viewers.

History
A radio news programme for young viewers titled Jeugdjournaal already existed as early as 1947 on Hilversum 2, commissioned by NCRV. By the 1950s, NTS, the predecessor to NOS, broadcast a youth current affairs programme called De verrekijker.

The idea of a televised youth news programme similar to that of the NTS Journaal arose in 1973, as research showed that there was an interest in this type of programme among children. In 1980, De Telegraaf reported that the board of NOS was not fully persuaded to have a programme similar to the BBC's Newsround, as it was not the task of the NOS to create youth-oriented programming. Other public broadcasters, such as AVRO, NCRV, KRO and TROS also protested against the idea of a current affairs programme for children. Some viewers argued that there was no need for a specified youth-orientated programme, rather the NOS should work to make the main news programme accessible to a wider audience. Ed van Westerloo, the then editor-in-chief of NOS Journaal, however called the idea an "enrichment".

Thanks to the decision of Til Gardeniers-Berendsen, then Minister of Culture, Recreation and Social Work, NOS received over a million guilders to produce Jeugdjournaal. The first broadcast was then planned for 1 October 1980 as part of a two-year trial. In May 1980, the first broadcast was delayed to 5 January 1981 as an excessive number of people  had applied for the five to seven available positions for the creation of the programme.

The first Jeugdjournaal broadcast received lukewarm responses. The show's first editor-in-chief, Arno Wamsteeker, blamed it on the lack of news that very 5 January 1981. In an NRC Handelsblad article of 31 December 1981, it was noted that most children were however satisfied with Jeugdjournaal.

Jeugdjournaal was nominated for the Gouden Stuiver, the most important television prize for children's programming, a total of seven times. The programme lost out in 1997, 2002, 2003, 2004, 2006 and 2008 before finally receiving the accolade in 2009.

Well-known presenters and reporters

 Milouska Meulens (2000–2015)
 Tamara Seur (2004)
 Siham Raijou (2010)
 Joris Marseille (2012)
 Lysette van Geel (2014)
 Welmoed Sijtsma (2015)
 Lucas van de Meerendonk (2017)
 Malou Petter (2017)
 Marga van Praag (1981–1996)
 Leoni Jansen (1982–1986)
 Robert ten Brink (1983–1989)

See also
 Newsround (BBC)

References

Related links

 

Dutch television news shows
Dutch children's television series
1980s Dutch television series
1990s Dutch television series
2000s Dutch television series
2010s Dutch television series
2020s Dutch television series
1981 Dutch television series debuts
Children's news shows
NPO 3 original programming